Kurkulica  (Albanian: Turtullesha) (Turtle Dove) is a mountain in Kosovo. Kurkulica is covered on all sides with dense forest except for a small area at the summit, making it ideal for large carnivores that are endangered species in the rest of Europe.

References

Mountains of Kosovo